Holger Rootzén (born 25 March 1945) is a Swedish mathematical statistician. He is Professor in Mathematical Statistics at the Department of Mathematical Sciences, Chalmers University of Technology since 1993.

Rootzén obtained his Ph.D. in 1974 with the thesis On sequences of random variables which are mixing in the sense of Renyi. He has earlier been professor at Lund University and lecturer at University of Copenhagen. Rootzén is member of the Royal Swedish Academy of Sciences. He also serves as adjunct member on the Price Committee for the Alfred Nobel Memorial Prize in Economic Sciences. He has been editor-in-chief for the scientific journals Extremes, Bernoulli, and Scandinavian Journal of statistics and has received many grants, including a 2013 grant of 50 million SEK from the Knut and Alice Wallenberg foundation.

Rootzén's research areas include probabilistic limit theory, statistics of extremes, and use of mathematics and statistics in medicine, engineering, and risk assessment in economics and environmental science.

References

External links 
 Holger Rootzén at the home page of the Royal Swedish Academy of Sciences
 Home page of Holger Rootzén at Chalmers University of Technology

1945 births
Living people
Academic staff of the Chalmers University of Technology
Members of the Royal Swedish Academy of Sciences
Swedish mathematicians
Swedish statisticians